The 23rd New York State Legislature, consisting of the New York State Senate and the New York State Assembly, met from January 28 to April 8, 1800, during the fifth year of John Jay's governorship, in Albany.

Background
Under the provisions of the New York Constitution of 1777, amended by the re-apportionment of March 4, 1796, Senators were elected on general tickets in the senatorial districts for four-year terms. They were divided into four classes, and every year about one fourth of the Senate seats came up for election. Assemblymen were elected countywide on general tickets to a one-year term, the whole assembly being renewed annually.

In 1797, Albany was declared the State capital, and all subsequent Legislatures have been meeting there ever since. In 1799, the Legislature enacted that future Legislatures meet on the last Tuesday of January of each year unless called earlier by the governor.

Congressman Jonathan N. Havens (D.-R.) died on October 25, 1799. Assemblyman John Smith (D.-R.) was elected in a special election in December 1799 to fill the vacancy.

In 1799, Cayuga County was split from Onondaga County, and was apportioned one seat in the Assembly, taken from Onondaga. Essex County was split from Clinton County, but remained in a double-county Assembly district.

At this time the politicians were divided into two opposing political parties: the Federalists and the Democratic-Republicans.

Elections
The State election was held from April 30 to May 2, 1799. Senators Richard Hatfield (Southern D.), Zina Hitchcock, Ebenezer Russell, Moses Vail (all three Eastern D.) and Vincent Mathews (Western D.) were re-elected. John B. Coles (Southern D.), Isaac Bloom, John Hathorn, John Suffern (all three Middle D.) and Moss Kent (Western D.) were also elected to the Senate.

Sessions
The Legislature met on January 28, 1800, at the Old City Hall in Albany; and adjourned on April 8.

Federalist Dirck Ten Broeck was re-elected Speaker without opposition.

The Legislature reduced the salary of the New York State Comptroller from $3,000 to $2,500 whereupon Samuel Jones declined to be re-appointed. On March 12, 1800, the Council of Appointment chose Assemblyman John Vernon Henry to succeed Jones.

On March 12, 1800, a bill was proposed to divide the State into districts to elect presidential electors by popular ballot. This was rejected by the Federalist majority [vote 55 to 47], and the electors continued to be chosen by joint ballot of the State Legislature.

On March 19, 1800, U.S. Senator James Watson (Fed.) resigned after his appointment as Naval Officer of the Port of New York. On April 3, 1800, the Legislature elected Gouverneur Morris (Fed.) to fill the vacancy.

State Senate

Districts
The Southern District (9 seats) consisted of Kings, New York, Queens, Richmond, Suffolk and Westchester counties.
The Middle District (12 seats) consisted of Dutchess, Orange, Ulster, Columbia, Delaware and Rockland counties.
The Eastern District (11 seats) consisted of Washington, Clinton, Rensselaer, Albany, Saratoga and Essex counties.
The Western District (11 seats) consisted of  Montgomery, Herkimer, Ontario, Otsego, Tioga, Onondaga, Schoharie, Steuben, Chenango, Oneida and Cayuga counties.

Note: There are now 62 counties in the State of New York. The counties which are not mentioned in this list had not yet been established, or sufficiently organized, the area being included in one or more of the abovementioned counties.

Members
The asterisk (*) denotes members of the previous Legislature who continued in office as members of this Legislature.

Employees
Clerk: Abraham B. Bancker

State Assembly

Districts

Albany County (9 seats)
Cayuga County (1 seat)
Chenango County (2 seats)
Clinton and Essex counties (1 seat)
Columbia County (6 seats)
Delaware County (2 seats)
Dutchess County (10 seats)
Herkimer County (3 seats)
Kings County (1 seat)
Montgomery County) (6 seats)
The City and County of New York (13 seats)
Oneida County (3 seats)
Onondaga County (1 seat)
Ontario and Steuben counties (2 seats)
Orange County (5 seats)
Otsego County (4 seats)
Queens County (4 seats)
Rensselaer County (6 seats)
Richmond County (1 seat)
Rockland County (1 seat)
Saratoga County (5 seats)
Schoharie County (1 seat)
Suffolk County (4 seats)
Tioga County (1 seat)
Ulster County (5 seats)
Washington County (6 seats)
Westchester County (5 seats)

Note: There are now 62 counties in the State of New York. The counties which are not mentioned in this list had not yet been established, or sufficiently organized, the area being included in one or more of the abovementioned counties.

Assemblymen
The asterisk (*) denotes members of the previous Legislature who continued as members of this Legislature.

Employees
Clerk: James Van Ingen
Sergeant-at-Arms: Ephraim Hunt
Doorkeeper: Peter Hansen

Notes

Sources
The New York Civil List compiled by Franklin Benjamin Hough (Weed, Parsons and Co., 1858) [see pg. 108f for Senate districts; pg. 117 for senators; pg. 148f for Assembly districts; pg. 173 for assemblymen]
Election result Assembly, Columbia Co. at project "A New Nation Votes", compiled by Phil Lampi, hosted by Tufts University Digital Library
Election result Assembly, Dutchess Co. at project "A New Nation Votes"
Election result Assembly, Onondaga Co. at project "A New Nation Votes"
Election result Assembly, Queens Co. at project "A New Nation Votes"
Election result Assembly, Rensselaer Co. at project "A New Nation Votes"
Election result Assembly, Schoharie Co. at project "A New Nation Votes"
Partial election result Senate, Southern D. at project "A New Nation Votes" [gives only votes from New York City]
Partial election result Senate, Middle D. at project "A New Nation Votes" [gives only votes from Columbia and Dutchess counties]
Partial election result Senate, Western D. at project "A New Nation Votes" [gives only votes from Onondaga and Schoharie counties]

1799 in New York (state)
1800 in New York (state)
024